Erenhot Saiwusu International Airport  is an airport serving the city of Erenhot, Inner Mongolia Autonomous Region, China. Construction started in June 2008 with a total investment of 257 million yuan, and the airport was opened on 1 April 2010. Due to its proximity to the border the airport attracts a substantial portion of its passengers from Mongolia.

Airlines and destinations

See also
List of airports in China
List of the busiest airports in China

References

Airports in Inner Mongolia
Airports established in 2010
2010 establishments in China